The 1954 Cleveland Browns season was the team's fifth season with the National Football League. The Browns' defense became the first defense in the history of the NFL to lead the league in fewest rushing yards allowed, fewest passing yards allowed, and fewest total yards allowed. 

The Browns were 9–3 in the regular season and won the Eastern Conference. They hosted the NFL Championship Game, and met the two-time defending champion Detroit Lions for the third straight year. This year's result was different, as the Browns won with a 56–10 blowout.

The teams had met on the same field the previous week, in a meaningless game won 14–10 by the Lions. Both teams had already clinched their respective conference titles; it was postponed from early October due to the World Series. After the win, Detroit was a slight favorite for the title game.

Offseason
Defensive Back Don Paul arrived via a trade with the Washington Redskins, who acquired him from the Chicago Cardinals. Upon his arrival in Washington, he fell in disfavor with George Preston Marshall of the Redskins.

In January 1954, assistant coach Weeb Ewbank departed to become head coach of the Baltimore Colts.

NFL draft
The 1954 NFL Draft was one of the biggest busts in the team's history. With the first overall pick in the draft, the Browns selected quarterback Bobby Garrett out of Stanford University. The plan was that he would be the heir to Otto Graham. Garrett suffered from a stuttering problem which hindered his performance in the huddle. Eventually, Garrett was traded to the Green Bay Packers in exchange for Babe Parilli, although Parilli would not play for the Browns until 1956. Later in the first round, the club selected John Bauer, who never played for the Browns and only played in two NFL games in his career.

Roster

Exhibition schedule

Regular season

Schedule

Note: Intra-division opponents are in bold text.

Standings

NFL Championship Game

References

External links 
 1954 Cleveland Browns at Pro Football Reference (profootballreference.com)
 1954 Cleveland Browns Statistics at jt-sw.com
 1954 Cleveland Browns Schedule at jt-sw.com
 1954 Cleveland Browns at DatabaseFootball.com  

Cleveland
Cleveland Browns seasons
National Football League championship seasons
Cleveland Browns